Mohammad Hassan Ein Afshar is an Iranian football goalkeeper who plays for Baadraan Tehran in the Azadegan League.

Club career
Eyn Afshar started his career with Siah Jamegan from Division 2. He made his professional debut for Siah Jamegan on October 31, 2015 against Saipa as a starter.

Club career statistics

References

External links
 Mohammad Hassan Ein Afshar at persianleague.com

1982 births
Living people
Iranian footballers
Association football goalkeepers
Siah Jamegan players